René Berra (born February 13, 1942) is a retired Swiss professional ice hockey player who played in the National League A for HC Villars, HC La Chaux-de-Fonds and EHC Biel. He also represented the Swiss national team at the 1972 Winter Olympics.

References

External links
René Berra's stats at Sports-Reference.com

1942 births
Living people
EHC Biel players
HC La Chaux-de-Fonds players
HC Villars players
Ice hockey players at the 1972 Winter Olympics
Olympic ice hockey players of Switzerland
Swiss ice hockey forwards